Crime of the Decade is a 1984 Australian TV movie.

References

External links

Crime of the Decade at Ozmovies

Australian drama television films
1984 television films
1984 films
Films directed by Ken Cameron
Films scored by Chris Neal (songwriter)
1984 drama films
1980s English-language films